Guillaume François-Gabriel Lépaulle (21 January 1804, Versailles28 August 1886, Aÿ) was a French painter associated with the Barbizon school. He painted landscapes historical works and genre scenes, although his best known works are portraits.

Biography 
He was a student of Jean-Baptiste Regnault, Horace Vernet and Jean-Victor Bertin at the École nationale supérieure des Beaux-Arts. His debut at the Paris came in 1824, with a scene depicting the invention of the lyre. Over the next few years, he became a regular annual contributor, with a profusion of subjects, based on his extensive travels to Spain, Italy, North Africa and Turkey. He also exhibited at the Exposition Universelle (1855)

Despite these scenes, ranging from the tragic to the picturesque, to the humorous, most were judged to have little merit. His high regard stems largely from his portraits, in the gallery at the Palace of Versailles, representing Napoléon III, Admiral Henri de Rigny,  (Duc de Plaisance) and many other prominent figures.

He is also known for his decorative paintings at the churches of Saint-Merri and Saint-Vincent-de-Paul, as well as designing costumes for a performance of Robert le Diable, by Giacomo Meyerbeer, at the Paris Opera in 1835. The genre painter, is one of his more notable students.

His works may be seen at the Bibliothèque-musée de l'Opéra, Musée des Arts Décoratifs,  and the Musée de l'Histoire de France

Sources 
 Gustave Vapereau, Dictionnaire universel des contemporains, 5th ed., Paris, Hachette, pg. 1144

External links 

More works by Lépaulle @ ArtNet
"François-Gabriel Lépaulle " @ the Base Joconde
François-Gabriel Lépaulle, peintre (1804-1886) by Monique Collet @ Google Books
A later photograph of Lépaulle

1804 births
1886 deaths
19th-century French painters
French portrait painters
French landscape painters
French genre painters
Decorative arts
French costume designers
People from Versailles